Great Patchogue Lake is located just north of Montauk Highway and is bordered by Waverly Avenue to the west and North Ocean Avenue to the east.

Patchogue Lake was dammed to provide water power for the textile industry hence its other name: Lace Mill Pond.

Today it is home to a diverse warm water fish community. Abundant perch and crappie provide plentiful fishing opportunities in the spring.
 
Species present (naturally reproducing):

Largemouth bass
Chain pickerel
Pumpkinseed
Black crappie
Yellow perch
Brown bullhead

Informal access to the lake is available from East Second Street on the west shore.

Hand launched boats are allowed; shoreline access is available but very limited.

Patchogue Lake bridge 

Patchogue Lake Bridge is a concrete arch bridge over Patchogue Lake on Roe Boulevard in Patchogue.

Overview:
Concrete arch bridge over Patchogue Lake on Roe Boulevard in North Patchogue
Location - Suffolk County, New York
Status   - Open to traffic

History
Built 1920
Design
Arch
Dimensions
Length of largest span: .
Total length: .
Deck width: .
Recognition
Eligible for the National Register of Historic Places

External links
http://www.dec.ny.gov/outdoor/24189.html
http://bridgehunter.com/ny/suffolk/2261610/
https://www.nytimes.com/1911/06/18/archives/patchogue-an-indian-name-meaning-patches-of-water-plans-of.html

Brookhaven, New York
Patchogue, New York
Lakes of New York (state)
Lakes of Suffolk County, New York
Tourist attractions in Suffolk County, New York